Evan Anderson Davis is a New York City attorney with the law firm Cleary Gottlieb Steen & Hamilton, and a former president of the New York City Bar Association.

Education
Davis was raised in Greenwich, Connecticut and educated at Phillips Exeter Academy, class of 1962. He obtained his A.B. from Harvard College in 1966, and his Juris Doctor, magna cum laude, from Columbia Law School in 1969. While at Columbia, he was Editor-in-Chief of the Columbia Law Review. After graduation, he clerked for Judge Harold Leventhal of the United States Court of Appeals for the District of Columbia, and subsequently for Justice Potter Stewart of the United States Supreme Court.

Career
In 1974, Davis worked on the U.S. House Judiciary Committee impeachment inquiry staff during the impeachment process against Richard Nixon. He led a task force that investigated the Watergate break-in and cover-up.

Davis joined Cleary Gottlieb in 1975 and became a partner in 1978, working in litigation and international and domestic dispute resolution. From 1985 to 1991, he served as counsel to New York State Governor Mario Cuomo. He rejoined the firm in 1991.

Recent clients Davis has represented include Bank of America, Barclays Bank, Lloyd's of London, Goldman Sachs, the American Museum of Natural History, the Guggenheim Foundation, and the Museum of Modern Art.

In 2017 to 2018, he advocated for a Constitutional Convention in New York state.

Civic involvement and awards
In addition to his service under Mario Cuomo, Davis was a candidate for New York State Attorney General in 1998. From 2000 to 2002 he served as president of the New York City Bar Association. In 2008, he was recommended for appointment as the Chief Judge of the New York Court of Appeals by the state Commission on Judicial Nomination.

Among the honors he has received, in 2016 the New York State Bar Association bestowed on Davis its Gold Medal Award. Previously, Davis was awarded the Medal for Excellence by Columbia University in 1987, the Emory Buckner Award for Distinguished Public Service by the Federal Bar Council in 1990, an environmental award by the Wildlife Conservation Society in 1995, and the Milton Gould Award for Outstanding Appellate Advocacy by the Office of the Appellate Defender in 1996. He also received the William J. Brennan Jr. Award for Outstanding Contribution to Public Discourse by the Brennan Center in 1999, the Law and Society Award by New York Lawyers for the Public Interest in 2000, and the Whitney North Seymour Award by the Federal Bar Council in 2002.

Personal life
In 1995, he married Mary Carroll Rothwell, also an attorney, in New York City. They have three daughters: Sara, Charlotte and Phoebe Davis.

See also
 List of law clerks of the Supreme Court of the United States (Seat 8)

References

Selected publications

External links
 Bio at Cleary Gottlieb
 Evan Davis Law Firm, mediation and arbitration.
 Bio at Bloomberg.com
 Appearances on C-SPAN

Living people
Year of birth missing (living people)
1940s births
20th-century American lawyers
21st-century American lawyers
Columbia Law School alumni
Harvard College alumni
Phillips Exeter Academy alumni
Law clerks of the Supreme Court of the United States
Presidents of the New York City Bar Association
People associated with Cleary Gottlieb Steen & Hamilton
Lawyers from New York City
People from Greenwich, Connecticut